The Chief Election Commissioner is the authority and the appointed chair of the Election Commission of Pakistan— an institution constitutionally empowered to conduct free and fair elections to the national and provincial legislatures.

Before 1973, appointment of the commissioner only restricted to the civil services and appointments came from the President. After the promulgation of much and thoroughly reformed constitution in 1973, the constitutional provisions made mandatory and compulsory that the only appointments would come from the judicature branch's judges who were eligible to become Chief Election Commissioner, however later on an amendment to the Constitution allowed civil servants to be appointed to the post as well. The Constitution (or President on different occasions) lays the appointment and oath administered by the Chief Justice of Pakistan.

Appointment of the Chief Election Commissioner

The President of Pakistan appoints the Chief Election Commissioner and four members of Election Commission of Pakistan. The Prime Minister and Leader of the Opposition in the National Assembly recommend three names for appointment of CEC and for each Member to a parliamentary committee for hearing and confirmation of any one person against each post. The parliamentary committee consisting of 12 members is constituted by the Speaker of the National Assembly comprising 50% members from treasury benches and 50% from opposition parties out of which one-third shall be from Senate, the Chief Election Commissioner have tenure of 3 years. The Chief Election Commissioner enjoy the same official status as available to Judges of the Supreme Court of Pakistan. The Chief Election Commissioner can be removed by the President of Pakistan or Supreme Court of Pakistan or through an impeachment in National Assembly of Pakistan.

Duties and functions 

Under the Constitution of Pakistan Chief Election Commissioner has the following duties:
Preparing electoral rolls for elections to the National Assembly and Provincial Assemblies and revising such rolls annually.
To organise and conduct election to the Senate and fill casual vacancies in a House or a Provincial Assembly.
Appointment of Election Tribunals.
A commissioner also hears and decides cases of disqualification of members of Parliament and Provincial Assemblies. And receipt of reference from the chairman or the Speaker or Head of the political party, as the case may be.
To hold and conduct election to the office of the President as per Second Schedule to the Constitution of the Islamic Republic of Pakistan
To hold Referendum as and when ordered by the President.
To make rules providing for the appointment of officers and servants to be employed in connection with the functions of the Chief Election Commissioner or an Election Commission and for their terms and conditions of employment. Under this power the Honorable Chief Election Commissioner framed the Election Commission (Officers & Servants) Rules, 1989

List of former Chief Election Commissioners of Pakistan 

The following is the list of former Chief Election Commissioners of Pakistan:

Note: A very small number of chief election commissioners have enjoyed their stipulated three-year term in office. The majority has either served for a shorter term or for extended tenures which were as long as seven years.

References

External links
   APPOINTMENT OF CHIEF ELECTION COMMISSIONER AND ELECTION COMMISSION 
  
  Election Commission of Pakistan
  Constitution of Pakistan Articles 213–221
  Pakistan Observer
  The News
  Supreme Court of Pakistan
  The Dawn

Election Commission of Pakistan
Chief Election Commissioners of Pakistan
Elections in Pakistan